Tyrell Ashcroft (born 7 July 2004) is an English professional footballer who plays as a defender for the Premier League club Tottenham Hotspur.

Career
Ashcroft came through the youth system at Reading, and made his professional debut for the club in a 1–0 EFL Championship loss to Millwall on 2 November 2021. He finished the 2021/22 season with 4 starts for the club, and was named on the bench 11 times.

On 1 July 2022, Tottenham Hotspur announced the signing of Ashcroft to their academy.

Career statistics

Club

References

External links
 

2004 births
Living people
English footballers
Reading F.C. players
Association football defenders